Mishi Juma Khamisi Mboko is a Kenyan politician and a  Member of Parliament for Likoni Constituency in Mombasa County. Mishi Mboko has been a member of the Orange Democratic Movement (ODM), since 2017

Education 

Mishi Juma attended Mtongwe Primary School where she obtained 
Kenya Certificate of Primary Education from 1978—1985. She attended Likoni Secondary School where she obtained  Kenya Certificate of Secondary Education from 1986-1989. She graduated from the University of Nairobi with Diploma in Public Relations from 2004-2005. In 2012 she graduated from Moi University where she obtained her Bachelor of Science (Bsc.) Communications and Public Relations. She also obtained Certificate in Secretarial and Office management as a private candidate in PITMAN 1990-1991 and Diploma in Banking part 1 as Private candidate in KNEC 1991-1992.

Career 

Mishi Mboko career started in 1993 as a Personal Assistant to the Managing Director at C. Mehta & Co. Chemist in Mombasa. In 1993 to 1994, she worked as Office Manager for Composite Insurance Company, from 1995 to 2005 and as an Administration Manager for Swara Forwarders in Momba. She started working from 2005 to 2010 as community engager and manager in private businesses. From 2010 to 2012 she worked as a Public Officer for Kwale County council. She has been a board member of the Central Agricultural Board since 2010

Political Life
Mishi Juma Mboko served as the Mombasa Woman Representative from 2013 to 2017, with the aim of initiating women empowerment programmes. Mishi Juma Mboko is a member of the Kenyan National Assembly and the Orange Democratic Movement party and currently serves as member of Parliament (MP) for Likoni Constituency. She took over from Mwalim Masoud Mwahima in 2017 and was re-elected in 2022 as a member of the 13th parliament of Kenya.

See also
 13th parliament of kenya

References 

Orange Democratic Movement politicians
Kenyan women representatives
University of Nairobi alumni
Moi University alumni
People from Mombasa County
Members of the 11th Parliament of Kenya
Members of the 12th Parliament of Kenya
Members of the 13th Parliament of Kenya
21st-century Kenyan politicians
21st-century Kenyan women politicians